Hey! Say! JUMP 2007-2017 I/O is the compilation album by Japanese all-male band Hey! Say! JUMP. The album was released on July 26, 2017 in Japan under their record label J-Storm in three editions: 2 types of first-run limited edition and regular edition. The album is sold for 297 thousand copies in the first week, and topped Oricon's weekly chart on August 7, 2017.

Album information
The album title, I/O, is pronounced as input/output. It also to be written as "10", as the album is released to celebrate the group's 10th anniversary in November 2017. It contains all singles from Hey! Say! JUMP's very first single, "Ultra Music Power" until their 22nd single, "OVER THE TOP" that was released in February 2017. In the first-run limited edition 2, the top 10 songs were determined through fan voting.

The album was released in 3 editions: the first-run limited edition 1 includes a special packaging, 40 pages "I/Oth Anniversary" special photobook, 2 CDs contains 23 singles, and a DVD of music video collection contains 21 songs. The first-run limited edition 2 includes a special packaging, 40 pages lyrics booklet, 2 CDs contains 23 singles, and a CD contains 10 top songs voted by fans. The regular edition includes a 32 pages lyrics booklet, an alternative cover package, and 2 CD contains 23 singles and 2 newly recorded songs.

Songs
The first-run limited edition 2 added songs that previously only been sung on concerts and songs that was included in the group's previously released album. All songs were voted by the fans. The regular edition added 2 newly recorded songs: "I/O" and "H.Our time." "I/O" (pronounced as Input Output) is created to celebrate the group's 10th anniversary that means "so far" and "from now on." The second new song "H.Our Time" is the group's first song to be written by all of the Hey! Say! JUMP's members and with melody composed by Keito Okamoto. The song was made with the feelings of 9 members who make the lyrics in relay form.

Songs

References

External links
Product information 

Hey! Say! JUMP albums
Japanese-language albums